In complex analysis, a branch of mathematics, the
Hadamard three-circle theorem is a result about the behavior of holomorphic functions.

Let  be a holomorphic function on the annulus

The conclusion of the theorem can be restated as

	
for any three concentric circles of radii

History
A statement and proof for the theorem was given by J.E. Littlewood in 1912, but he attributes it to no one in particular, stating it as a known theorem. Harald Bohr and Edmund Landau attribute the theorem to Jacques Hadamard, writing in 1896; Hadamard  published no proof.

Proof
The three circles theorem follows from the fact that for any real a, the function Re log(zaf(z)) is harmonic between two circles, and therefore takes its maximum value on one of the circles. The theorem follows by choosing the constant a so that this harmonic function has the same maximum value on both circles.

The theorem can also be deduced  directly from Hadamard's three-lines theorem.

See also
Maximum principle
Logarithmically convex function
Hardy's theorem
Hadamard three-lines theorem
Borel–Carathéodory theorem
Phragmén–Lindelöf principle

Notes

References
 
 
 E. C. Titchmarsh, The theory of the Riemann Zeta-Function, (1951) Oxford at the Clarendon Press, Oxford. (See chapter 14)

External links 
 "proof of Hadamard three-circle theorem"

Inequalities
Theorems in complex analysis